Belothrips is a genus of insects belonging to the family Thripidae.

The species of this genus are found in Europe and Northern America.

Species:
 Belothrips acuminatus (Haliday, 1836) 
 Belothrips morio Reuter, 1901

References

Thripidae
Thrips genera